Shred Optics is a manufacturer of sunglasses, helmets and goggles designed for skiing, mountain biking, snowboarding and other forms of outdoor recreation. The company is based in Park City, Utah, and Venice, Italy.

History 
Shortly after winning his first Olympic gold medal in alpine skiing, Ted Ligety partnered with Carlo Salmini, a materials engineer, graduate of the MIT Sloan School of Management and avid skier, to create Shred in the fall of 2006. Just a few months earlier, the duo also created Slytech, which manufactures protective equipment for skiing, snowboarding and mountain biking.

Shred made its debut with a collection of four goggles, followed by helmets and sunglasses. Since its inception, the brand has placed an emphasis on freeride culture, catering to the needs of skiers, snowboarders and mountain bikers. It has sponsored numerous athletes, including snowboarders Romain De Marchi, Wolle Nyvelt, Tadashi Fuse, Kevin Backstrom, Victor de Le Rue, Brandon Cocard, Shin Biyajima, and Antti Autti, as well as mountain bikers Kelly McGarry, KC Deane, Reece Wallace, and Ryan Nyquist. The company has also sponsored skiers Lara Gut, Carlo Janka, Resi Stiegler, Alexis Pinturault, and Tom Wallisch.

Technical Innovation

Rotational Energy System 

In 2015, Shred introduced one of the first helmet systems designed to not only address the linear forces of impact energy, but also its rotational forces. Historically, helmets only mitigated the effects of linear forces, leaving skiers, bikers and snowboarders more susceptible to injury. Shred’s patent pending Rotational Energy System (RES) mimics the natural cushioning behavior of the fluid between the skull and the brain. RES redirects rotational forces by allowing a small amount of relative movement between the helmet and the head during impacts from any direction. This reduces rotational energy transferred to the head. Since its inception, RES has been noted for its ability to offer protection from rotational energy in all directions. Unlike other systems, it has no preferential directions that compromise the protection the helmet affords. It also has minimal impact on the helmet’s weight and dimensions.

Contrast Boosting Lens 
In 2016, Shred introduced its Contrast Boosting Lens (CBL) technology to enhance clarity and contrast. Featured in the brand’s goggles and sunglasses, these lenses use a variety of tinted dyes that are tailored to the prevailing light conditions and activities for which the goggles or sunglasses are designed.

ShredWide 

ShredWide is a goggle lens and frame design principle that reduces field of vision restrictions in products designed for skiers, bikers and snowboarders. By offering a larger field of vision, this design aims to enhance safety and performance. Shred emphasized this larger field of vision beginning with its initial goggle collection.

NoDistortion 
Shred’s patented NoDistortion technology uses a semi-permeable valve to equalize the pressure between a goggle’s dual lens chamber and the current atmospheric conditions. This eliminates optical distortion while preventing moisture from entering the goggles’ lens chamber. Shred introduced its NoDistortion technology in 2011.

Slytech NoShock 
Slytech NoShock technology creates an increased efficiency in shock absorption by pairing two protective foams that have different mechanical properties. A foam with a honeycomb cone structure is integrated into an adjacent matrix made from a foam that is stiffer and thicker. The foam that is stiffer and thicker compresses when subjected to impact energy. 

Shred uses several different foams in its NoShock technology, selecting materials and their pairing based on the specific needs and uses of each product. Shred employs NoShock technology in its skiing, snowboarding and biking helmets while Slytech uses a slightly modified version of it in its back protectors, protective vests, elbow pads, knee pads and other protective equipment. The brand developed the NoShock concept in 2013 and filed for a patent for it that same year.

Philanthropy 
In 2017, Shred partnered with Protect Our Winters, a climate advocacy group that focuses on the winter sports community. Shred donates a portion of its proceeds to POW’s efforts to combat climate change and educate the public about its effects. Shred has also partnered with POW to develop a goggle that uses waste recycled from the snowboard manufacturing process.

External links 
 SHRED.® Official Store: Goggles, Helmets & Body Protection

References

Sporting goods manufacturers of the United States
Eyewear brands of the United States
Sunglasses
Companies established in 2006
Protective gear
Skiing equipment
Ski equipment manufacturers
Snowboarding companies